The 1997–98 Romanian Hockey League season was the 68th season of the Romanian Hockey League. Six teams participated in the league, and Steaua Bucuresti won the championship.

Regular season

Playoffs

3rd place
Sportul Studențesc Bucharest - CSM Dunărea Galați (3-1, 7-2, 8-4)

Final
CSA Steaua Bucuresti - SC Miercurea Ciuc (3-2, 1-3, 0-3, 7-5, 1-0)

External links
Season on hockeyarchives.info

Romanian Hockey League seasons
Romanian
Rom